The Zuiderzee or Zuider Zee (old spelling Zuyderzee or Zuyder Zee) was a shallow bay of the North Sea in the northwest of the Netherlands, extending about 100 km (60 miles) inland and at most 50 km (30 miles) wide, with an overall depth of about 4 to 5 metres (13–16 feet) and a coastline of about 300 km (200 miles). It covered . Its name is Dutch for "southern sea", indicating that the name originates in Friesland, to the north of the Zuiderzee (cf. North Sea). In the 20th century the majority of the Zuiderzee was closed off from the North Sea by the construction of the Afsluitdijk, leaving the mouth of the inlet to become part of the Wadden Sea. This land eventually became the province of Flevoland, with a population of nearly 400,000 (2011).

History and disasters

In classical times there was already a body of water in this location, called Lacus Flevo (Lake Flevo) by Roman authors. It was much smaller than its later forms and its connection to the main sea was much narrower; it may have been a complex of lakes and marshes and channels, rather than one lake.

Over time these lakes gradually eroded their soft peat shores and spread (a process known as waterwolf). Some part of this area of water was later called the Vlie; it probably flowed into the sea through what is now the Vliestroom channel between the islands of Vlieland and Terschelling.

The Marsdiep was once a river (fluvium Maresdeop) which may have been a distributary of the Vlie. During the early Middle Ages this began to change as rising sea levels and storms started to eat away at the coastal areas which consisted mainly of peatlands. In this period the inlet was referred to as the Almere, indicating it was still more of a lake, but the mouth and size of the inlet were much widened in the 12th century and especially after a disastrous flood in 1282 broke through the barrier dunes near Texel. The disaster marked the rise of Amsterdam on the southwestern end of the bay, since the seagoing traffic of the Baltic trade could now visit.

The even more massive St. Lucia's flood occurred 14 December 1287, when the seawalls broke during a storm, killing approximately 50,000 to 80,000 people in the fifth largest flood in recorded history. The name "Zuiderzee" came into general usage around this period.

The size of this inland sea remained largely stable from the 15th century onwards due to improvements in dikes, but when storms pushed North Sea water into the inlet, the Zuiderzee became a volatile cauldron of water, frequently resulting in flooding and the loss of ships. For example, on 18 November 1421, a seawall at the Zuiderzee dike broke, which flooded 72 villages and killed about 10,000 people. This was the Second St. Elizabeth's flood.

The Netherlands was part of the First French Empire between 1810 and 1813. A département was formed in 1811 and named as Zuyderzée after the Zuiderzee, whose territory roughly corresponded to the present provinces of North Holland and Utrecht.

In 1928, the 6-meter and 8-meter sailing events for the Amsterdam Summer Olympics were held on the Zuiderzee.

Geography and development

Around the Zuiderzee many fishing villages grew up and several developed into walled towns with extensive trade connections, in particular Kampen, a town in Overijssel, and later also towns in Holland such as Amsterdam, Hoorn, and Enkhuizen. These towns traded at first with ports on the Baltic Sea, in England, and in the Hanseatic League, but later also with the rest of the world when the Netherlands established its colonial empire. When that lucrative trade diminished, most of the towns fell back on fishing and some industry until the 20th century when tourism became the major source of income.

Contained within the Zuiderzee were five small islands, the remains of what were once larger islands, peninsulas connected to the mainland, or in the case of Pampus, an artificial island. These were Wieringen, Urk, Schokland, Pampus and Marken. The inhabitants of these islands also subsisted mainly on fishing and related industries and still do in the case of Urk and Wieringen. All of these islands, except for Pampus, are now part of the mainland or connected to it.

The construction in the early 20th century of a large enclosing dam (the Afsluitdijk) tamed the Zuiderzee. The creation of this dam was a response to the flood of January 1916. Plans for closing the Zuiderzee had been made over thirty years earlier but had not yet passed in parliament. With the completion of the Afsluitdijk in 1932, the Zuiderzee became the IJsselmeer, and large areas of water could be reclaimed for farming and housing. These areas, known as polders, were respectively the Wieringermeer, the Noordoostpolder and Flevoland.

This enormous project under the direction of Cornelis Lely, called the Zuiderzee Works, ran from 1919 to 1986, culminating in the creation of the new province of Flevoland. The reclamation project was originally intended to also reclaim the former southwestern portion of the Zuiderzee, a polder that would have been called the Markerwaard, but this final stage of the reclamation project was indefinitely postponed in the 1980s.

See also
Almere (lake)

References

External links

Zuiderzee Museum, dedicated to the history and culture of the former Zuiderzee
Zuiderzee Cycle Route, long-distance cycle route around the former Zuiderzee

Venues of the 1928 Summer Olympics
Bays of the Netherlands
Former bays
Sailing at the 1928 Summer Olympics